Nicola Albani (born 15 April 1981) is a retired San Marinese footballer who last played for S.S. Murata and formerly the San Marino national football team. He scored in the 1–1 draw with Latvia. He is maybe best known for being elbowed by Colin Hendry in an incident which would see the Scotland defender retire from international football.

International goals
Scores and results list. San Marino's goal tally first.

References 

1981 births
Living people
Sammarinese footballers
San Marino international footballers
S.S. Murata players
A.C. Juvenes/Dogana players

Association football defenders